Steve Orich (born October 20, 1954 in Valley Stream, New York)  is a composer, orchestrator and musical director.

Professional work
Steve Orich was nominated for the Tony Award for Best Orchestrations in 2006  for his work on Jersey Boys which won the Tony Award for Best Musical on Broadway.  The album also won the 2006 Grammy Award.  He has written orchestrations for many shows, including The Cher Show, Priscilla Queen of the Desert, Paint Your Wagon, 110 in the Shade and Cole Porter's You Never Know and Can-Can at the Pasadena Playhouse and the Paper Mill Playhouse as well as Stephen Schwartz's Snapshots.

As a composer, he has scored many television series and specials including ACE Award-winning documentaries Mo' Funny for HBO and All About Bette Davis for TNT, Bob Hope . . . Laughing with the Presidents for NBC, and the award-winning PBS/Lifetime documentary Jackie Onassis: An Intimate Portrait.  Other television shows he has worked on include A Very Brady Christmas, The Bradys, Mucha Lucha, and I Love Lucy's 50th Anniversary Special.  He is also an occasional arranger for American Idol.

He has orchestrated and conducted albums for artists including Helen Reddy, Judy Kaye, Debbie Gravitte, Petula Clark and Deborah Gibson. At the Pasadena Playhouse, he has conducted productions of 110 in the Shade, Do I Hear a Waltz? and A Class Act, as well as the International Tour of A Class Act in Tokyo. Recently, he orchestrated and conducted Michael Feinstein's Great American Songbook at the Mark Taper Forum and was Vocal Director for Leonard Bernstein's Mass at the Hollywood Bowl. He orchestrated Tommy Tune's new musical, Turn of the Century at the Goodman Theatre (Chicago), Noah Racey's Pulse, Josephine and Beatsville at the Asolo Repertory Theatre. He also wrote new orchestrations for Camelot which has had productions around the world. Most recently, he was Music Supervisor, Arranger and Orchestrator for Romeo and Bernadette.

His orchestrations have been performed by the Boston Pops, at Carnegie Hall, the Kennedy Center, the White House and around the world.

References

External links
 www.steveorich.com

Orich
Orich
Orich
Valley Stream Central High School alumni
Theatre in New York City
 Musicians from New York (state)